Paschale Mysterium is Latin for "The mystery of Easter". 
The words have been used as the title of albums of Gregorian chant for Easter.

Sony

An album entitled Paschale Mysterium was issued as a vinyl record in 1976; it was re-released by Sony Records in 1998. The music was sung by the German choir Capella Antiqua München directed by its regular conductor Konrad Ruhland.

Several samples of the album were used without permission for the album MCMXC a.D. by Enigma, for example the antiphon "Procedamus in pace!". This antiphon was used in the track "Sadeness (Part I)", which appeared as a single in late 1990, shortly before the album was released. After a lawsuit in 1994, compensation was paid.

Track listing
 Nos autem, introit
 Procedamus in pace! (Antiphon)
 Ave, Rex noster, Fili David (Antiphon)
 Hoc corpus, communion in mode 8 (Liber Usualis, No 573b)
 Ubi est caritas, antiphon in mode 7
 Congregavit nos in unum Christi amor, caritas song to the washing of the feet on Holy Thursday
 Passio Domini, evangelium passions et mortis Domini (John 2): John 18, 33, 36–37; 19, 1.5–6. 15)
 Ecce Lignum Crucis & Trisagio, antiphon in Mode 6
 Popule meus, impromeria
 Incipit Lamentatio
 Recessit pastor noster, responsory
 Oratio Ieremiae
 Respice, quaesumus, Domine
 Haec dies quam fecit Dominus: Christus Dominus resurrexit!
 Halleluja, Halleluja, (Ostern 1)

Naxos

There is also a similarly titled album on Naxos released in 1997.
It is sung by the Italian women's choir Aurora Surgit plus a male cantor.

See also
 Mysterium Paschale

External links
 Paschale Mysterium, Capella Antiqua München (1998 rerelease) at Allmusic [ link]
 Paschale Mysterium: Gregorian Chant, Aurora Surgit (1996 recording) at Allmusic link

1976 albums
Christian chant albums
Easter music compilation albums